University Field is a baseball venue in Hempstead, New York, United States.  It is home to the Hofstra Pride baseball team of the NCAA Division I Colonial Athletic Association.  The facility has a capacity of 400 spectators.  The field features a Competition Turf artificial surface in the infield and a natural grass surface in the outfield.

Renovations 
In the 1990s and 2000s, the facility underwent several renovations.  In 1990, a new, wooden outfield wall was constructed.  In 1991, new dugouts were added, foul territory fencing was replaced, and fencing was built around the bullpens.  In 2002 and 2003, 70-foot sunken dugouts with fencing were constructed.  In 2004, the warning track was resurfaced.  In 2006, a new electronic scoreboard, located beyond the right center field fence, was installed.  In 2010, the Quinn Family Grandstand, which includes 400 chairback seats and a press box, was completed.

See also
 List of NCAA Division I baseball venues

References 

College baseball venues in the United States
Baseball venues in New York (state)
Hofstra Pride baseball
Sports venues in Hempstead, New York